Manto is a 2015 Pakistani biographical drama film based on the life of Pakistani short-story writer Sadat Hassan Manto, starring Sarmad Khoosat in the title role. It was directed by Khoosat himself, produced by Babar Javed, and written by Shahid Nadeem, whose screenplay was adapted from Manto's short stories,  particularly "Thanda Gosht", "Madari", "License", "Hatak" and "Peshawar Se Lahore". It also depicts his relationship with singer-actress Noor Jehan. The film was released on 11 September 2015, sixty years after Manto's death.

The full-length official trailer was released on 29 August 2015. The motion trailer along with film music was released on 6 August 2015. The TV series on the life of writer entitled Main Manto with the same cast and production, initially made in 2012, was aired in December 2015.

Plot
The story is about a 20th-century writer, Manto (played by Sarmad Khoosat), who grew up in the showbiz industry of Bombay (now Mumbai) and Lahore. It focuses the last seven years of the writer's life, during which he wrote some of his  most controversial stories, such as "Thanda Gosht", "Toba Tek Singh", "License", "Upar, Neechay aur Darmiyan" and "Peshawar Se Lahore". For these, Manto had to face charges of obscenity thrice.

Cast 
 Sarmad Khoosat as Saadat Hasan Manto
 Sania Saeed as Safiya Manto
 Saba Qamar as Noor Jehan
 Danyal Adam Khan as Hamid Jalal
 Adnan Jaffar as Qudrat Ullah Shahab
 Shamoon Abbasi as Eishar Singh 
 Aliee Shaikh as Khuda Bakash
Tipu Sharif as Shaukat Hussain Rizvi 
 Talha Mufti as Nawaz
 Arjumand Rahim as Nazneen (a Tawaif)
 Hina Khawaja Bayat as Begum Sahiba
 Rehan Sheikh as Mian Saheb
 Faisal Qureshi as Radio Actor
 Nadia Afghan as Saugandhi
 Savera Nadeem
 Nimra Bucha
 Irfan Khoosat 
 Afraz Rasool
 Shakeel Hussain Khan as Manto's Doctor
 Yasra Rizvi as Balwant Kaur
Qaiser Naqvi as Sardar Begum
 Mahira Khan as Madaran (appeared in screen credits and in the song "Kya Hoga")
 Azfar Rehman as a Passenger (appeared in screen credits and in the song "Kya Hoga")
 Humayun Saeed (cameo appearance in screen credits)
 Mohammed Hanif (guest appearance)
 Suhaee Abro (appearance in the song "Kaun Hai Ye Gustakh" in an opening scene)
 Vajdan Shah (appearance in the song "Kaun Hai Ye Gustakh" in an opening scene)

Soundtrack
The music album was released on 6 August 2015, at a Blue Carpet event held at Nueplex Cinema, Karachi by distributors Geo Entertainment and Geo Films. The soundtrack, including background score, sound mixing, editing and original songs, was composed by Jamal Rahman of True Brew Records. Khoosat, who hired Rahman after hearing his work for Mira Nair's The Reluctant Fundamentalist, said, "I want to make it yours and run with it." Three of the four songs are taken from famous poets, including Majeed Amjad, Mirza Ghalib and Indian Punjabi poet Shiv Kumar Batalvi. One song was written by Muhammad Hanif. One song of the film, sung by Ustad Salamt Ali Nazar, was neither revealed nor announced at the launch. The soundtrack was praised for its classical genre, strong lyrics and soulful music composition.

Track listing

Release
Initially the film was scheduled to release in late 2014 but was postponed due to delays in post-production. The first teaser trailer was released on 6 August 2015, for limited special screening. The official trailer was released online on 29 August 2015. Manto was released on 11 September 2015 in Pakistan under the banners of Geo Films. Before theatrical release in the US, the film was screened at three of eight Ivy League institutions, including Harvard University, Columbia University, Yale University and the University of California, Berkeley between 16 and 25 October.

Reception

Box Office
Below is the film's Weekly breakdown..

Week One.. 1.58cr

Week Two.. 1.77cr

Week Three.. 67lacs

Week Four + Week Five.. 57lacs

Week Six.. 20lacs

Week Seven*.. 11lacs

Week Eight Onward.. 15lacs

Total.. 5.03cr

Critical reception
The film has been positively received by critics, with Dawns Mehreen Hasan calling it "A darkly perfect biopic". Blasting News Adnan Murad stated, "With an interestingly intricate premise, 'Manto' depicts the life of an accomplished writer of the subcontinent. The movie clearly rests on the shoulders of supremely talented Sarmad, who eloquently plays Manto."
Galaxy Lollywood gave it 4.4 out of 5 stars, calling it "As big of a must watch for every Pakistani as perhaps Jamil Dehlavi's Jinnah was."

Accolades

TV series

In 2012, before developing the film, a TV series based on the life and literary work of Saadat Hassan Manto, titled Main Manto, was made. It had a total of 20 episodes and was made with the same cast and production as the film. Both the film and the television series were directed by Sarmad Khoosat, who also played the title character. Playwright Shahid Nadeem served as a screenwriter and Babar Javed produced the serial and film under A & B Entertainment at Geo Films. The series was scheduled to release in 2012, but was put on hold for the film production. Later it aired in November 2017 on Geo Entertainment with 18 episodes.

See also
 Manto (2018 film), Indian biographical film of the writer
 List of Pakistani films of 2015
 List of highest-grossing Pakistani films

References

External links
  
 

2015 films
2015 biographical drama films
Pakistani biographical drama films
Films about writers
Films based on television series
Drama films based on actual events
Films set in Karachi
Films set in Lahore
Geo Films films
Films set in 1934
Films set in 1955
Films directed by Sarmad Khoosat
Saadat Hasan Manto
2015 comedy films
2015 drama films
2010s Urdu-language films